is a 1991 shoot'em-up video game developed by Sigma Pro-Tech and published by Vic Tokai in 1991 for the Nintendo Game Boy.

Plot 
After the end of the Sixth World War, the Earth has been rendered inhospitable and uninhabitable by humanity. The Intergalactic Council ruled that Earth could once again be used by humans and sent people there to restore civilization there. Meanwhile, mutants have prospered in the long-lost wastelands of Earth and were unwilling to allow the humans to have it again. The Intergalactic Council has sent in a lone fighter called Aerostar to defend the Earth from a second act of total destruction.

Gameplay

The player controls a futuristic airplane that can only fly over certain roads. However, the aircraft can ascend and descend into other roads at the cost of being able to use firearms.

There are a variety of power-ups in the game; including missiles and lasers. Large bosses challenge the player in each level. There are three difficulty levels: easy, normal, and hard. Graphic details in the game include coastal streets, futuristic levels with instant-death spikes, jungles, and a fight in outer space.

Reception
Allgame gave this video game a 2.5 out of 5 rating on their overview.

References

1991 video games
Game Boy games
Game Boy-only games
Post-apocalyptic video games
Shoot 'em ups
Single-player video games
Top-down video games
Vic Tokai games
Video games developed in Japan